Hélder Ribeiro Silva (born 1 August 1991), commonly known as Hélder, is a Brazilian footballer who plays as a midfielder for CRAC.

Club career
Hélder started his career at Atlético Mineiro, but would spend time with Amparense, Itaúna and Cabofriense before settling at Náutico.

After notching up 9 Série A appearances in 2013, Hélder was hopeful he would be able to secure his place in the first team. However, he was loaned to Central in 2014 alongside fellow Náutico player João Paulo. Neither spent much time at the Caruaru-based side, with both returning less than two months later.

He was loaned to Croatian side Slaven Belupo in the summer of 2016.

Career statistics

Club

Notes

References

1991 births
Living people
Brazilian footballers
Brazilian expatriate footballers
Association football midfielders
Clube Atlético Mineiro players
Esporte Clube Itaúna players
Associação Desportiva Cabofriense players
Clube Náutico Capibaribe players
Clube Atlético do Porto players
Salgueiro Atlético Clube players
Anápolis Futebol Clube players
NK Slaven Belupo players
Central Sport Club players
Boa Esporte Clube players
Luverdense Esporte Clube players
Clube Recreativo e Atlético Catalano players
Campeonato Brasileiro Série A players
Campeonato Brasileiro Série B players
Campeonato Brasileiro Série D players
Croatian Football League players
Brazilian expatriate sportspeople in Croatia
Expatriate footballers in Croatia